Serpentine is a town located  south-southeast of Perth, the capital of Western Australia, and 7 km south of Mundijong.

Serpentine is located on the South Western Railway between Perth and Bunbury, and was one of the original stations when the line was opened in 1893. The population of the town was 128 (80 males and 48 females) in 1898. At the 2016 census, Serpentine had a population of 1,265.

In 1891 the government had opened up land in the area by declaring the Serpentine Agricultural Area, and in 1893 decided there was sufficient demand for town lots by gazetting the Townsite of Serpentine in December 1893. The townsite derives its name from the nearby Serpentine River. The name is descriptive, derived from the "serpentine" nature of the river in its lower reaches where it was discovered and named in the early 1830s.

It is the locality to which the BOM weather radar has been shifted following on from the original Perth location in West Perth.

The Bodhinyana Buddhist Monastery is located near the town.

Serpentine also serves as a stop on the Australind passenger train from Perth to Bunbury.

See also
 Karnet Prison

References

Towns in Western Australia
Shire of Serpentine-Jarrahdale